Thomas or Tom Bush may refer to:

Tom Bush (rugby league) (born 1990), English rugby league player
Tom Bush (footballer, born 1914) (1914–1969), English footballer
Tom Bush (Australian footballer) (1918–1951), Australian rules footballer
Tom Bush (politician) (born 1948), politician and lawyer in the American state of Florida
Tom Bush (basketball) in Cleveland Cavaliers draft history
Thomas M. Bush, racehorse trainer in Turf Classic Stakes

See also